The Christian Examiner is an online Christian news site. Prior to July 1, 2014, it was a tabloid newspaper, published by Selah Media Group serving Southern California, Western Washington and the Minneapolis–Saint Paul metropolitan area of Minnesota. In early 2014, the newspaper ceased publishing and in July 2014 the trademark, URLs and website were sold to the Christian Media Corporation (CMC Group) which operates Christian Post.

External links
 Christian Examiner website

Christian media